Frank Bradshaw Ryan (born 27 July 1995) is an Irish rugby union player, currently playing for United Rugby Championship and European Rugby Champions Cup side Ulster. He plays as a lock.

Sometimes known as just Frank Bradshaw, Bradshaw Ryan is from Limerick and was a member of 's sub academy, before moving to France in 2016. Between 2017 and 2022, he made over one-hundred appearances in the French Rugby Pro D2. Despite signing a two-year extension with Nevers, he joined  ahead of the 2022–23 United Rugby Championship.

References

External links
Ulster Rugby profile
itsrugby.co.uk Profile

1995 births
Living people
Irish rugby union players
Rugby union players from Limerick (city)
USON Nevers players
Ulster Rugby players
Rugby union locks